Kelly Marie Monaco (born May 23, 1976) is an American actress, model, and reality television personality, best known for her portrayal of Sam McCall on the ABC soap opera General Hospital and as the first season winner of the reality TV competition series Dancing with the Stars.  Monaco was also Playboy "Playmate of the Month" for April 1997, and portrayed Livvie Locke on the soap opera Port Charles from 2000 through 2003.

Early life and education
Kelly Monaco was born in Philadelphia, Pennsylvania to Albert "Al" and Carmina Monaco. She is the middle child and has four sisters: Christine, Marissa, Carmina and Amber. The family moved to the Poconos, where she attended Pocono Mountain High School and took her first acting classes. After high school she worked as a lifeguard at a local resort and attended Northampton Community College for two years.

Career

Early modeling
In 1996, Monaco, who had been thinking of a career in modeling, sent her photo to Playboy. As a result, she became the Playmate of the Month for April 1997. Throughout her tenure with Playboy in the 1990s, Monaco was also featured in many Playboy Special Edition publications.

Acting and reality television
Monaco's first television role was in the drama Baywatch from 1997 to 1998. In addition to playing the role of Susan on the show, Monaco was also Carmen Electra's body double at times, as Electra could not swim. Monaco also had minor roles in the late 1990s films BASEketball, Idle Hands, and Mumford.

Monaco had two roles in the ABC soap opera Port Charles: Olivia "Livvie" Locke Morley (1999–2003) and Tess Ramsey (2002–03). When that program ended, she joined the cast of the ABC soap opera General Hospital as Samantha McCall in October 2003.

In 2003, Monaco was nominated for a Daytime Emmy Award for Outstanding Supporting Actress in a Drama Series for her role on Port Charles. In 2006, Monaco was again nominated for a Daytime Emmy, this time for Outstanding Lead Actress in a Drama Series for her role as Sam McCall on General Hospital. In 2006, Monaco also co-hosted the 33rd Annual Daytime Emmys, with Dancing with the Stars host Tom Bergeron.

In March 2009, Monaco was chosen by Donald Trump and Paula Shugart to be one of the judges for the 2009 Miss USA pageant.

Monaco starred on the E! reality television series Dirty Soap, which premiered on September 25, 2011.

Monaco was a cast member, and the season winner along with her professional partner, Alec Mazo, on the ABC reality television series Dancing with the Stars, during its first season in 2005. Although she initially faced tough criticism from the judges, she maintained a positive outlook throughout the series. Among the events she experienced before her victory was a wardrobe malfunction in which the skimpy strap on her dress came apart during a Latin dance number.

Monaco appeared in a Maxim cover feature in 2005, and the magazine also placed her at #13 on their annual Hot 100 List in 2006. 

In February 2009, Monaco expanded her dancing résumé with Peepshow, a burlesque act directed by Tony Award-winning director Jerry Mitchell, that plays at the Planet Hollywood Resort and Casino in Las Vegas. Monaco starred as Bo Peep, a precocious character who discovers her sexuality throughout the show. Monaco starred alongside singer and fellow Dancing with the Stars contestant Melanie Brown, until June 2009, when Monaco's contract expired and she was replaced by Holly Madison. The same year, Monaco was named Maxim's number one sexiest cover model of the decade.

On July 27, 2012, it was announced that Monaco would be participating in the 15th season of Dancing with the Stars for a chance to win a second mirrorball trophy. This time she was partnered with Valentin Chmerkovskiy. After making the finals for a second time, Monaco finished in third place on November 27, 2012.

In November 2017, Monaco returned to 25th season of Dancing with the Stars in week eight, to participate in a trio rumba with Terrell Owens and his professional partner Cheryl Burke.

Charity work
In July 2009, Monaco and several other daytime celebrities traveled to Kenya, Africa, as a part of the Feed the Children program, delivering food and other supplies and visiting schools and orphanages built by Feed the Children.

On October 24, 2009, as part of the iParticipate campaign, Monaco and several of her General Hospital co-stars volunteered to help beautify a school in Los Angeles.

Personal life
When Monaco was a junior in high school, she met Mike Gonzalez, and began a relationship with him. They worked together as lifeguards at a local resort and attended community college together. They remained together for 18 years. They broke up in 2009, but as seen in the premiere episode of the reality television series Dirty Soap in 2011, she was still mourning the loss of this relationship.  Monaco's General Hospital costar Kirsten Storms counseled her through her feelings on that episode by convincing her to burn her prom dress.

On April 25, 2009, Monaco's apartment at the Planet Hollywood Resort and Casino was ransacked by burglars.

Filmography

Film

Television

Awards and nominations

References

External links
 
 
 
 

1976 births
American female models
American soap opera actresses
American television actresses
Living people
Participants in American reality television series
Actresses from Philadelphia
1990s Playboy Playmates
Dancing with the Stars (American TV series) winners
Female models from Philadelphia
20th-century American actresses
21st-century American actresses